Mela Ilandaikulam (Tamil : மேல இலந்தைகுளம்) a village in Manur taluk, Tirunelveli district, Tamil Nadu state, India. It is situated west of National Highway 7 between Kayathar and Devarkulam, 6 km from Devarkulam and 09 km from Kayathar. There is 1 higher secondary school, 1 middle school and 1 primary school.

Economy
The primary business of Mela Ilandaikulam is agriculture. The primary crops produced by the village include: rice, cotton, onions, tomatoes, green chili peppers and peanuts.

Demographics
The 2011 census registered a village population of 3,824, with 1,897 males and 1,927 females.  The literacy rate is 67%. 56% of the population are classified as workers, with the non-workers including housewives, children, and students. 10% of the population was under six years of age.

Infrastructure
Mela Ilandaikulam has over five hundred Suzlon Energy windmills, each generating about 600 kW to 2100 kW of electricity.

Education
 R.C. Primary School (Grades 1-5)
 TDTA Middle School (Grades 1-8)
 Thiru Iruthaya Higher Secondary School (Grades 6-12)

Culture 
Mela Illandaikulam has Temples, Mosques, and Churches.

The Hindu Temples include
 Pathirakaliamman Temple
 Annamalai swamy Temple
 Sri Mariamman Temple
 vadakuvaselvi amman
 Sakthi vinayagar Temple
 Ulagamman Temple
 Sudalai Madan Temple
 Isakki Amman Temple
 Sri Ganesha Temple
 Sri meensudalai madasamy
 Aiyanar Temple
 Karuppa Sami Temple
 sriman narayanasamy Temple
 The Islamic mosques include
 Pallivaasal Mosque
 The churches include
 St. Paul Church of the Church of South India (CSI). They celebrate Christmas, and also have a seven-day festival every 20 May
 Church of the Sacred Heart of Jesus (St. Annai Velankanni Matha Church). They are part of the Roman Catholic Church They hold annual festivals in the second week of May, and also the Thiru Iruthaya Andavar festival, which starts on 20 May, and which lasts for three days.

Image gallery

References

Villages in Tirunelveli district